2017 Thai League 4 Eastern  Region is the 8th season of the League competition since its establishment in 2009. It is in the fourth tier of the Thai football league system.

Changes from last season

Team changes

Promoted clubs

Promoted to the 2017 Thai League 2
 Trat

Two club was promoted to the 2017 Thai League 3 Upper Region.
 Cha Choeng Sao
 Sa Kaeo

Promoted from the 2016 Thai Division 3 Tournament Eastern Region
 Bankhai United

Relegated clubs

 TA Benchamarachuthit were relegated to the 2016 Thai Division 3 Tournament Eastern Region.

Relocated clubs

 Pattaya and Royal Thai Fleet were moved from the Bangkok & Eastern Region 2016.
 Samut Prakan were moved to the 2017 Thai League 4 Bangkok & field Region
 Pattaya City were moved to the 2017 Thai League 4 North Eastern Region

Expansion clubs

 Prachinburi United was promoted to the 2017 Thai League 3 but this Club-licensing football club didn't pass to play 2017 Thai League 3. This team is relegated to 2017 Thai League 4 Eastern Region again.

Reserving clubs
Chonburi B is Chonburi Reserving this team which join Northern Region first time.

Stadium and locations

League table

Results 1st and 2nd match for each team

Results 3rd match for each team
In the third leg, the winner on head-to-head result of the first and the second leg will be home team. If head-to-head result are tie, must to find the home team from head-to-head goals different. If all of head-to-head still tie, must to find the home team from penalty kickoff on the end of each second leg match (This penalty kickoff don't bring to calculate points on league table, it's only the process to find the home team on third leg).

Season statistics

Top scorers
As of 10 September 2017.

Attendance

See also
 2017 Thai League
 2017 Thai League 2
 2017 Thai League 3
 2017 Thai League 4
 2017 Thailand Amateur League
 2017 Thai FA Cup
 2017 Thai League Cup
 2017 Thailand Champions Cup

References

External links
  Division 2
 http://fathailand.org/news/97
 http://www.thailandsusu.com/webboard/index.php?topic=379167.0

Regional League Central-East Division seasons